This is a list of notable pancakes. A pancake is a flat cake, often thin and round, prepared from a starch-based batter and cooked on a hot surface such as a griddle or frying pan. In Britain, pancakes are often unleavened, and resemble a crêpe. In North America, a raising agent is used (typically baking powder). The North American pancake is similar to a Scotch pancake or drop scone.

Pancakes

 
 
 
 
 
 
 
 
 
 
 
 
 
 
 
 
 
 
 
 
 
 
 
 
 
 
 
 
 
 
 
 
 
 
 
 
 
 
 
 
 
 
 
 
 
 
 
 
 
 
 
 
 
 
  
  
 
 
 
 
 
 
 
 
 
 
 
 
 
 
 
 
 
 
 
 
 
 
 
 
 
 
 
 
 
 
 
 
 
 
 
 
  – also referred to as spring onion pancake

See also

 Pearl Milling Company – is a brand of pancake mix, syrup, and other breakfast foods
 Crepe maker
 List of bread dishes
 List of quick breads
 Lists of prepared foods
 List of toast dishes
 Pancake breakfast
 Pancake pen

References

Pancakes
Pancake